Jawaid Khaliq, MBE (born 30 July 1970), is a British former professional boxer who competed from 1997 to 2004. A dual Pakistan national, he became the first British Asian boxing world champion, winning the lightly-regarded IBO welterweight title in 2001 and defending it seven times before retiring three years later. He also held multiple regional championships, including the Commonwealth welterweight title in 2000.

Personal life
Khaliq took up boxing at the age of 16. Within a short span of time, he went on to win the Amateur Boxing Association of England championships and fought for England. Whilst boxing, Khaliq also worked as a taxi driver to support his family and initially went back to the trade after retirement, later using it to fund his Boxing Academy. He achieved an MBE for his service to his community.

Professional career
Khaliq made his boxing debut at the age of 27 in 1997. Initially, he started taking fights on short notice, taking his second fight on a day's notice, and his third fight on two days' notice.

Light middleweight
As a light middleweight he held the WBF Inter-Continental Light Middleweight Title, winning the bout in way of 5th round TKO. He also held the BBBofC Midlands Area light-middleweight title, winning that bout in way of 6th round TKO.

Welterweight
As a welterweight, he held BBBofC Midlands Area welterweight title, winning the bout in way of 4th round TKO and Commonwealth welterweight title, before finally winning the International Boxing Organization welterweight title, and made seven defences before he chose to retire and vacate the title.

Promotional issues
Following the win over Willy Wise for the IBO World Welterweight Title, Khaliq started to want to pursue big fights in the U.S., coincidentally, world-class fighters such as Vernon Forrest started to call him out, but due to promotional issues Khaliq's ambitions failed to materialize.

Retirement
Khaliq chose to retire partly due to complications, stating;

"...I had a couple of years waiting for fights, seeing people pull out, (and) fights not happening. I had a couple of fights cancelled. I was fed up, (after which) we started talking about come-back fights. I saw it as a backward step... I always wanted to test myself against the very best guys... I've lost the hunger."

Life after boxing
After boxing, Khaliq started working full-time as a taxi driver to support his wife and children.

After requests from people asking him to train them, Khaliq set up 'Jawaid Khaliq Boxing Academy' in Nottingham which he funded by working as a taxi driver. The club claimed to prevent anti-social behaviour, and the police had acknowledged that the club has helped with the creation of healthy relationships with the local youth. However, in 2013, the club faced financial hurdles as it could not afford to stay on its current premises and faced the threat to close-down.

Khaliq has helped raise awareness about firefighting within the British Asian community, and has previously taken initiatives to help recruit more firefighters from within the community with the partnership of the service.

Professional boxing record

See also

British Pakistanis

References

External links
Jav Boxing Academy

English male boxers
English people of Pakistani descent
Living people
Members of the Order of the British Empire
Pakistani male boxers
English people of Mirpuri descent
1970 births
British sportspeople of Pakistani descent
British taxi drivers
Welterweight boxers